Lace on Her Petticoat is a play by the British writer Aimée Stuart. It takes place in a cottage on an island off the southwest coast of Scotland in the late Victorian era.

It premiered at the Connaught Theatre in Worthing before transferring to the Ambassadors Theatre in London's West End where it ran for 188 performances between 14 December 1950 and 26 June 1951. The original West End cast included Ellis Irving, David Keir, Muriel Aked, Perlita Neilson and Sophie Stewart. A 1951 production at the Booth Theatre on Broadway lasted for 79 performances.

References

Bibliography
 Wearing, J.P. The London Stage 1950-1959: A Calendar of Productions, Performers, and Personnel.  Rowman & Littlefield, 2014.

1949 plays
West End plays
Plays by Aimée Stuart
Plays set in Scotland
Plays set in the 19th century